A specimen stamp is a postage stamp or postal stationery indicium sent to postmasters and postal administrations so that they are able to identify valid stamps and to avoid forgeries.
The usual method of invalidating the stamps is either overprinting in ink or perforating the word Specimen across the stamp and where English is not the common language, the words Muestra (Spanish), Monster (Dutch), Muster (German) or Образец (Russian, 'Obrasetz') have been used instead.

History
Specimen stamps have been in use since the earliest issues and in 1840 examples of the Penny Black, Two penny blue and the Mulready Letter Sheet were sent to all British postmasters. These stamps were not marked in any way, but when the first British one shilling stamp was produced in 1847, examples sent to postmasters were marked with the word Specimen in order to prevent their postal use.

Since 1879, members of the Universal Postal Union have supplied stamps to each other through the UPU's International Bureau and stamps supplied this way have frequently found their way on to the philatelic market. Specimen stamps have no postal validity so postal administrations are free to distribute them as widely as they like and this can include to stamp dealers, philatelic magazines, government bodies, embassies and as promotional items for philatelists.

As many specimen stamps are worth more than the originals, they have often been forged. Inversely, many genuine specimens have had their overprints removed to make them resemble the much more expensive base stamps.

The use of specimen overprints is not restricted to postage stamps. It has also been used on revenue stamps and postal stationery, including International Reply Coupons.  A unique use was by the Portuguese U.P.U. officials at the end of the 19th and early 20th centuries when they hand-stamped postal stationery from Cuba with the term "ULTRAMAR" (overseas) to prevent postal usage.

See also 
 Specimen banknote
 Pattern coin

References

Further reading 
 Bendon, John. UPU Specimen Stamps. Abingdon: Oxford Book Projects, 2015  560p.
 Easton, John. The De La Rue History of British & Foreign Postage Stamps 1855 to 1901. London: Faber & Faber for The Royal Philatelic Society London,  1958 846p.
 Samuel, Marcus. Specimen Stamps of the Crown Colonies, 1857-1948. London: Royal Philatelic Society London, 1976 255p. (Supplement 1984)
 Samuel, Marcus & Alan Huggins. Specimen Stamps and Stationery of Great Britain. Safron Walden: G.B. Philatelic Publications Ltd., 1980 254p. (Winner Crawford Medal 1981)
 "The Universal Postal Union Collection: Postal Stationery" in British Library Philatelic Collections Newsletter, Issue 15, Spring 2009.

External links 

James Bendon's specimen stamps
Queen Victoria specimen stamps
UPU Specimen Stamps of the British Commonwealth
Philatelic terminology